Laura Dupuy may refer to:

 Laura Dupuy Lasserre (born 1967), Uruguayan diplomat
 Laura Martin, comic book colorist who has worked under the name Laura DePuy